Andries Strauss born 5 March 1984 in Pretoria, South Africa is a former rugby union player that played as a centre.

Career

Free State Cheetahs

Sharks

He quickly established himself as a regular, starting twelve of the Sharks' matches during the season.

Return to the Cheetahs

In August 2010, Strauss signed a deal with the Cheetahs for the 2011 Super 15 season, due to the departure of Cheetahs centre Meyer Bosman who joined the Sharks the next season. In 2011 and 2012 Strauss made almost 40 appearances for the Cheetahs in Super Rugby and the Currie Cup and also played with his cousin Adriaan Strauss during this time.

Kings

He started thirteen of their sixteen matches during the season – most of them as captain following an injury to regular captain Luke Watson. However, Strauss broke his hand towards the end of the campaign and missed the 2013 Super Rugby promotion/relegation play-offs, which saw the  gain entry into the 2014 Super Rugby season at the Kings' expense. He also missed the entire 2013 Currie Cup First Division season with the same injury.

Edinburgh

He signed for Scottish side Edinburgh Rugby at the start of 2014, tying him to the club until 2016. His first points for the club came during a Pro12 encounter with Cardiff Blues the following November.

Representative rugby

In November 2010, after an injury to stand-in full-back and centre Zane Kirchner, Strauss received a call up to play for the Springboks to face a star-studded Barbarians side at Twickenham in a non-test match. Although it was a non-test match, this thus far, is his only appearance for the national team.

At youth level, he played for the South Africa Under-21 side, playing two matches for them in the 2004 Under 21 Rugby World Championship. He also represented the South Africa Sevens side during the 2006–07 IRB Sevens World Series competition.

Personal life

Strauss is the brother of Irish international hooker Richardt Strauss, as well as the cousin for South African international hooker Adriaan Strauss.

References

1984 births
Living people
Afrikaner people
South African rugby union players
Sharks (rugby union) players
Sharks (Currie Cup) players
Cheetahs (rugby union) players
Free State Cheetahs players
Eastern Province Elephants players
Southern Kings players
Rugby union centres
Rugby union players from Pretoria
Alumni of Grey College, Bloemfontein
South Africa international rugby sevens players
South Africa international rugby union players